Ryan Russell (born May 2, 1987) is a Canadian former professional ice hockey forward. He played in the National Hockey League (NHL) with the Columbus Blue Jackets. Russell has a twin brother, Kris who is currently playing for the Edmonton Oilers.

Playing career
Russell was drafted by the New York Rangers in the 2005 NHL Entry Draft (7th round, 211th overall). He was drafted from the Kootenay Ice in the WHL where he played from 2003 till 2007. After the 2006–07 season with the Ice, Russell was unable to come to terms with the Rangers and was traded to the Montreal Canadiens for a seventh round pick in the 2007 NHL Entry Draft on May 31, 2007. He was swiftly signed to a three-year entry level contract by the Canadiens.

In his first professional season in 2007–08, Russell split the year between both affiliates of the Canadiens the Cincinnati Cyclones in the ECHL and the Hamilton Bulldogs of the AHL. While with the Cyclones, he scored a series-winning shorthanded goal in overtime of Game Five to send the Cyclones into the Kelly Cup Finals. They went on to win the Kelly Cup in six games. On July 20, 2010, Russell was re-signed by the Canadiens as a restricted free agent to a one-year contract.

On July 7, 2011, Russell was traded to the Columbus Blue Jackets for Michael Blunden. He joined his brother Kris Russell with the Blue Jackets organization.

On January 7, 2012, Russell made his NHL debut with the Blue Jackets in a 1–0 win over the Los Angeles Kings. On January 13, 2012, Russell scored his first NHL goal against Jason LaBarbera of the Phoenix Coyotes.

As a free agent, on July 29, 2013, Russell signed his first European contract, agreeing to a one-year deal with Leksands IF of the Swedish Hockey League, Ryan resigned after his first season with Leksands.

On January 11, 2016, Russell joined the Cardiff Devils of the Elite Ice Hockey League (EIHL) in the United Kingdom. Russell made his debut for the Cardiff Devils at home versus the Belfast Giants, scoring 2 points with a goal and an assist, earning him a man of the match accolade.

Career statistics

References

External links

1987 births
Canadian expatriate ice hockey players in Sweden
Canadian ice hockey centres
Cardiff Devils players
Cincinnati Cyclones (ECHL) players
Columbus Blue Jackets players
Hamilton Bulldogs (AHL) players
Ice hockey people from Alberta
Kootenay Ice players
Leksands IF players
Living people
New York Rangers draft picks
Sportspeople from Red Deer, Alberta
Springfield Falcons players
Canadian twins
Twin sportspeople
Canadian expatriate ice hockey players in the United States
Canadian expatriate ice hockey players in Wales